Boys on Film is a Peccadillo Pictures DVD series of compilations of independent LGBT-themed shorts.

Chronology DVD 
 2009: Boys on Film 1: Hard Love
 2009: Boys on Film 2: In Too Deep
 2009: Boys on Film 3: American Boy
 2010: Boys on Film 4: Protect Me From What I Want
 2010: Boys on Film 5: Candy Boy
 2011: Boys on Film 6: Pacific Rim
 2011: Boys on Film: Bad Romance
 2012: Boys on Film 8: Cruel Britannia
 2013: Boys on Film 9: Youth in Trouble
 2013: Boys on Film X
 2014: Boys on Film 11: We Are Animals
 2014: Boys on Film 12: Confession
 2015: Boys on Film 13: Trick & Treat
 2016: Boys on Film 14: Worlds Collide
 2016: Boys on Film 15: Time & Tied
 2017: Boys on Film 16: Possession
 2017: Boys on Film 17: Love is the Drug
 2018: Boys on Film 18: Heroes
 2019: Boys on Film 19: No Ordinary Boy
 2020: Boys on Film 20: Heaven Can Wait
 2021: Boys on Film 21: Beautiful Secret
 2022: Boys on Film 22: Love to Love You

References

External links
Pecadillo Pictures main page

LGBT-related short films
American film series
2000s English-language films
2010s English-language films
2020s English-language films